is a Japanese actor and singer.

Early life
Takashima comes from a family of actors, including his father Tadao Takashima, his mother Hanayo Sumi, and his younger brother Masanobu Takashima.

Career

Acting
Takashima debuted in the 1987 film Totto Channel, directed by Kazuki Ōmori. His part as Tsuda in Busu that same year earned him the Japan Academy Prize for Newcomer of the Year, as well as the Blue Ribbon Award, Hochi Film Award, Kinema Junpo Award, and the Mainichi Film Award for Best New Actor in 1988. Since that time he has appeared in feature films, including Gunhed, Legend of Zipang (1990), Godzilla vs. Mechagodzilla II, Godzilla vs. Destoroyah, and Kakushi Toride no San-Akunin: The Last Princess, and  The Climbers High. He appeared in the television crime drama Sangaku kyûjotai Shimon Ikki.

Singing
As a singer, Takashima released singles and albums from 1992 to 1994. He covered the King Crimson song Starless on the B side of his 1993 single Kowarerukurai Dakishimetai (こわれるくらい抱きしめたい). On Rock Fujiyama, he was nicknamed Starless Takashima (スターレス髙嶋) because he was a King Crimson enthusiast.

Personal life
Takashima married stage actress Sylvia Grab in 2005.

Takashima's has expressed a love for rock music, especially progressive rock. He is a fan of Kiss, and admitted in an interview with the Japanese weekly magazine Flash, that the first concert he attended was a Kiss show at Nippon Budokan in 1978. Takashima appeared on the Japanese music show Rock Fujiyama in 2006 and 2007, speaking about his favorite English band King Crimson, stating that he had attended live concerts of the following groups: King Crimson, Michael Schenker Group, Yes and AC/DC. Takashima was asked to write the liner notes for King Crimson's compilation album The Condensed 21st Century Guide to King Crimson after his first appearance on Rock Fujiyama.

Takashima professes to enjoy the music of Grand Funk Railroad, Thin Lizzy, and the Sex Pistols. Takashima surprised Kiss enthusiast Marty Friedman of Megadeth when he showed rare Kiss memorabilia on Rock Fujiyama.

Filmography

Films
Gunhed (1989)
Godzilla vs. Mechagodzilla II (1993)
Godzilla vs. Destoroyah (1995)
Lady Maiko (2014)
Zakurozaka no Adauchi (2014), Shinnosuke Naitō
Nobunaga Concerto (2016), Shibata Katsuie
Gold Medal Man (2016)
Honnō-ji Hotel (2017), Akechi Mitsuhide
Kingdom (2019), Lord Changwen
Masquerade Hotel (2019), Furuhashi
Aircraft Carrier Ibuki (2019), Takanobu Taki
Three Nobunagas (2019), Kanbara Ujinori
Kaguya-sama: Love Is War (2019)
AI Amok (2020)
Grand Blue (2020), Toshio Kotegawa
Keep Your Hands Off Eizouken! (2020), Fujimoto
Baragaki: Unbroken Samurai (2021), Kiyokawa Hachirō
Dreams on Fire (2021)
Kaguya-sama Final: Love Is War (2021)
The Confidence Man JP: Episode of the Hero (2022)
Radiation House: The Movie (2022), Masato Haijima
Baseball Club Rhapsody (2022), coach Harada
Kingdom 2: Far and Away (2022), Lord Changwen
Safe Word (2022)

Television
Dokuganryū Masamune (1987), Katakura Shigenaga
Mōri Motonari (1997), Amago Haruhisa
Toshiie and Matsu (2002), Tokugawa Ieyasu
Yae no Sakura (2013), Makimura Masanao
Nobunaga Concerto (2014), Shibata Katsuie
Prison School (2015), Chairman Kurihara 
Naotora: The Lady Warlord (2017), Honda Tadakatsu
Yū-san no Nyōbō (2021), Toshiro Mifune
Nakamura Nakazo: Shusse no Kizahashi (2021)
 Radiation House (2021), Masato Haijima
 Galápagos (2023), Mori

References

External links
Official page 

1965 births
Living people
Japanese male television actors
Male actors from Tokyo
Japanese male film actors
Seijo University alumni